Varun Arjun Medical College, established in 2016, is a full-fledged tertiary private Medical college and hospital. It is located at Shahjahanpur in Uttar Pradesh. The college imparts the degree of Bachelor of Medicine and Surgery (MBBS). The yearly undergraduate student intake is 150.

Courses
Varun Arjun Medical College undertakes the education and training of 150 students in MBBS courses.

Affiliated
The college is affiliated with Atal Bihari Vajpayee Medical University and is recognized by the National Medical Commission.

References

Medical colleges in Uttar Pradesh
Educational institutions established in 2016
2016 establishments in Uttar Pradesh